In molecular biology, the NELF (negative elongation factor) is a four-subunit protein complex (NELF-A, NELF-B, NELF-C/NELF-D, and NELF-E) that negatively impacts transcription by RNA polymerase II (Pol II) by pausing about 20-60 nucleotides downstream from the transcription start site (TSS).

Structure 
The NELF has four subunits within its complex which are the following: NELF-A, NELF-B, NELF-C/NELF-D, and NELF-E. The NELF-A subunit is encoded by the gene WHSC2 (Wolf-Hirschhorn syndrome candidate 2). Micro-sequencing analysis demonstrated that NELF-B was the protein previously identified as being encoded by the gene COBRA1. It is unknown whether or not NELF-C and NELF-D are peptides resulting from the same mRNA with different translation initiation sites; possibly differing only in an extra 9 amino acids for NELF-C at the N-terminus, or peptides from different mRNAs entirely. A single NELF complex consists of either NELF-C or NELF-D, but not both. NELF-E is also known as RDBP.

Function and Interactions 
NELF is located in the nucleus. NELF binds in a stable complex with DSIF (5,6-dichloro-1-β-d-ribofuranosylbenzimidazole (DRB)-sensitivity inducing factor) and RNA polymerase II together, but not with either alone. Due to its role in transcription, NELF is also a key player in the negative function of DSIF. NELF also works with DSIF to inhibit the speed of Pol II during the elongation phase in transcription. In D. melanogaster, the HSP70 gene is affected by NELF and DSIF through the induction of promoter proximal pausing. It is thought that NELF arose to assist DSIF by amplifying its negative effects in order to increase gene expression control.  P-TEFb (positive transcription elongation factor b) inhibits the effect of NELF and DSIF on Pol II elongation, via its phosphorylation of serine-2 of the C-terminal domain of Pol II, and the SPT5 subunit of DSIF, causing dissociation of NELF.

Another mechanism, interaction of enhancer RNA with NELF, causes dissociation of NELF from RNA polymerase II, resulting in productive elongation of mRNA, as studied in two immediate early genes.

However, many mechanisms by which NELF and DSIF operate remain unclear. NELF homologues exist in some metazoans (e.g. insects and vertebrates) but have not been found in plants, yeast, or nematodes (worms).

Interactions by subunit:

NELF-A: Pol II complex.

NELF-B: KIAA1191, NELF-E, and an early sequence of BRCA1.

NELF-C/D: ARAF1, PCF11, and KAT8.

NELF-E: NELF-B and HIV TAR RNA.

NELF undergoes Phase separation in vitro and Condensation in vivo

Clinical Significance 
The NELF complex is also possibly a player in the enlistment of gene PCF11 to the stopped Pol II in HIV-1 latency. NELF-A may play a role in the phenotype of Wolf-Hirschhorn syndrome (WHS) as it is mapped to the critical area of deletion on the short arm of chromosome 4. Pol II pausing controlled by NELF is a key source of R-loop aggregation in mammary epithelial cells that are BRCA1-deficient, which could ultimately lead to tumorigenesis.

References 

Protein complexes
Transcription factors